Kinneyville was an unincorporated community in Benton County, Washington, United States, and is now a part of Prosser.

History
The community was founded by in the early 1880s by James Gordon Kinney, a stage station master. At that time, Prosser was called Prosser Falls. By 1883, Kinneyville had two restaurants, several saloons, a hotel and a single residence. The community was called Kinneyville before merging with Prosser Falls to form Prosser.

See also
 Horse Heaven, Washington

References

Prosser, Washington
Unincorporated communities in Benton County, Washington
Unincorporated communities in Washington (state)